The Caucasus Front was a major formation of the army of the Russian Republic (the successor to the Imperial Russian Army) during the First World War. It was established in April 1917 by reorganization of the Russian Caucasus Army and formally ceased to exist in March 1918.

Creation
The reorganization of the Caucasus Army into the Caucasus Front was undertaken by the Russian Provisional Government as part of the military reforms following the February Revolution. During its entire year of existence, the Front was in a process of disintegration as revolutionary propaganda, the weakening of military discipline, desertion, and disease sapped the Front's strength.

General Yudenich was the commander of the Front at its creation. On May 31, 1917, he was removed for refusing to obey the Provisional Government's orders to resume offensive operations against the Turks, and was replaced by General Przhevalsky.

Composition
 Caucasus Army
5th Caucasian Army Corps
other separate formations
2nd Turkestani Army Corps
other separate formations
1st Caucasian Army Corps
other separate formations
6th Caucasian Army Corps
other separate formations
4th Caucasian Army Corps
other separate formations
2nd Caucasian Horse Corps
other separate formations
1st Caucasian Horse Corps
other separate formations
 Additional Front components
 Trapezund Fortified District
other separate formations
 Kars Fortress
other separate formations
 Alexandropol Fortress
other separate formations
 Reserve
other separate formations

Truce and dissolution
On December 5 1917 the Armistice of Erzincan was signed between the new Soviet government of Russia and the Turkish Third Army, formally ceasing fighting in the Caucasus. Nevertheless, the Turks continued some offensive operations, taking advantage of the fact that the Caucasus Front had effectively ceased to exist as a cohesive military force. Such resistance as the Turks met was offered by Armenian volunteer militia units. This was followed on March 3, 1918 by the Treaty of Brest-Litovsk ending all hostilities with the Turks.

Since the Caucasus Front dissolved, it did not have a true successor organization. The Army of the North Caucasus, which was renamed 11th Army on October 3, 1918, constituted the main Soviet army in the area during the Russian Civil War.

Sources

See also
Caucasian Front electoral district (Russian Constituent Assembly election, 1917)

See also
 List of Imperial Russian Army formations and units

Fronts of the Russian Empire
Military units and formations established in 1917
Middle Eastern theatre of World War I
Russo-Turkish wars
Wars involving Armenia
Wars involving the Ottoman Empire
Russian Revolution
Military units and formations of the Russian Civil War